Dr. Sharon Camp was the CEO and President of the Guttmacher Institute until her retirement effective July 15, 2013.

Career
Before her tenure at Guttmacher, Camp was the founder, CEO and President of Women’s Capital Corporation, “the company responsible for the development and commercialization of the Plan B emergency contraceptive.” The small pharmaceutical company was founded in January 1997 and is considered to be the mother of Plan B.

Camp was a key author of the Programme of Action adopted by the world’s governments at the 1994 International Conference on Population. From 1975 to 1993, Dr. Camp helped lead Population Action International including as Senior Vice President.

Dr. Camp has chaired the boards of Family Health International, the National Council for International Health (now the Global Health Council), and the International Center for Research on Women, and was founding Chair of the Reproductive Health Technologies Project.

Education
She is an honors graduate of Pomona College (class of 1965) and holds a Ph.D. in international studies from Johns Hopkins University as well as a M.A. from the same institution.

References

Pomona College alumni
Johns Hopkins University alumni
American women chief executives
Living people
Year of birth missing (living people)
21st-century American women